Lecanora markjohnstonii is a species of crustose lichen in the family Lecanoraceae. Found in the southern Appalachian Mountain region of the United States, it was described as a new species in 2018 by Carly Anderson Stewart, Erin Tripp, and James Lendemer. The specific epithet honors Mark Johnston, an Episcopalian priest known for his contributions to environmental education and outreach in Alabama.

The lichen has a thin, light green to grayish-green crustose thallus when fresh. Closely related species include Lecanora masana and Lecanora orientoafricana.

See also
List of Lecanora species

References

markjohnstonii
Lichen species
Lichens described in 2018
Fungi of the United States
Fungi without expected TNC conservation status